Richard Hébert is a Canadian politician who served as the Member of Parliament for the riding of Lac-Saint-Jean in the House of Commons of Canada from his election in a 2017 by-election  until his defeat in the 2019 federal election. He served as a member of the Liberal Party of Canada.

Prior to his election to Parliament, Hébert was the mayor of Dolbeau-Mistassini since November 2013.

Electoral record

References

Living people
French Quebecers
Liberal Party of Canada MPs
Members of the House of Commons of Canada from Quebec
Mayors of places in Quebec
People from Dolbeau-Mistassini
21st-century Canadian politicians
Year of birth missing (living people)